The affective spectrum is a spectrum of affective disorders (mood disorders). It is a grouping of related psychiatric and medical disorders which may accompany bipolar, unipolar, and schizoaffective disorders at statistically higher rates than would normally be expected.  These disorders are identified by a common positive response to the same types of pharmacologic treatments. They also aggregate strongly in families and may therefore share common heritable underlying physiologic anomalies.


Types 
Affective spectrum disorders include:

 Attention deficit hyperactivity disorder
 Bipolar disorder 
 Body dysmorphic disorder
 Bulimia nervosa and other eating disorders
 Dysthymia
 Generalized anxiety disorder
 Impulse-control disorders
 Kleptomania
 Major depressive disorder
 Obsessive-compulsive disorder
 Oppositional defiant disorder
 Panic disorder
 Posttraumatic stress disorder
 Premenstrual dysphoric disorder
 Social anxiety disorder

The following may also be present as co-morbidities for affective mood disorders

 Chronic pain
 Intermittent explosive disorder
 Pathological gambling
 Personality disorder
 Pyromania
 Substance abuse and addiction (includes alcoholism)
 Trichotillomania
 Irritable bowel syndrome
 Fibromyalgia
 Hypersexuality
 Migraine
 Cataplexy

Also, there are now studies linking heart disease.

Many of the terms above overlap. The American Psychiatric Association's definitions of these terms can be found in the Diagnostic and Statistical Manual of Mental Disorders (DSM).

See also 

 Affect (psychology)
 Psychopathology

Footnotes

Mood disorders
Spectrum disorders